Iraan is a city in Pecos County, Texas, United States. Its population was 1,229 at the 2010 census. The city's name is an amalgamation of the first names of Ira and Ann Yates, owners of the ranch land upon which the town was built.

History

Iraan was an oil boom town, and it developed quickly after the discovery of the gigantic Yates Oil Field, which is adjacent to the town on the southwest.  The oil field was discovered in 1926, and the first buildings in town were basic housing and infrastructure for workers on the field, all built by the Big Lake Oil Company, which became Plymouth Oil Company, which was purchased by the Ohio Oil Company, then purchased by Marathon Oil Company, and owned today by Kinder Morgan.  By 1927, the town included a school, and the post office appeared in 1928.  The population of the town in 1930 was about 1,600.  About 3 mi (5 km) south of Iraan was the oil boomtown of Redbarn, which appeared almost immediately after discovery of the oil field, before Iraan itself.  It was a collection of tents and shanties in the immediate vicinity of Ira Yates's ranch. Yates donated  of his ranch to the town of Iraan to encourage further development there, and in 1952, the town of Redbarn, which never had a permanent population more than 75, was finally abandoned.

One of Iraan's most famous residents was V.T. Hamlin, the creator of the comic strip Alley Oop.  Originally from Iowa, he worked in Iraan during the oil boom period of the late 1920s, and he  either got the idea for the strip or created its earliest drafts there; the strip was first published in 1932 in Des Moines.  He moved back to Iowa in 1929 and later to Florida.  A park in Iraan is named after the strip.

In 2021, Jason Rybolt, the CEO of Iraan General Hospital, stated that Iraan had a 42% positivity rate of COVID-19. Rosa Flores and Ashley Killough of CNN described the town as being hard hit by the COVID-19 pandemic in Texas in 2021.

Geography

Iraan is located at  (30.913511, –101.898614). State Highway 349 and U.S. Highway 190 converge at Iraan. The Pecos River loops around the town to the north and east.

Climate

According to the Köppen climate classification system, Iraan has a semiarid climate, BSk on climate maps.

Demographics

2020 census

As of the 2020 United States census, there were 1,055 people, 384 households, and 291 families residing in the city.

2000 census
At the 2000 census,  1,238 people, 427 households, and 335 families resided  in the city. The population density was 2,234.3 per square mile (869.1/km). The 542 housing units averaged 978.2 per square mile (380.5/km). The racial makeup of the city was 92.00% White, 0.08% African American, 0.08% Native American, 6.22% from other races, and 1.62% from two or more races. Hispanics or Latinos of any race were 36.51% of the population.

Of the 427 households, 45.7% had children under the age of 18 living with them, 70.3% were married couples living together, 4.2% had a female householder with no husband present, and 21.5% were not families. About 20.1% of all households were made up of individuals, and 7.7% had someone living alone who was 65 years of age or older. The average household size was 2.90 and the average family size was 3.37.

Age distribution was 32.5% under the age of 18, 6.9% from 18 to 24, 30.3% from 25 to 44, 20.4% from 45 to 64, and 9.9% who were 65 years of age or older. The median age was 33 years. For every 100 females, there were 101.3 males. For every 100 females age 18 and over, there were 101.0 males.

The median household income was $44,583, and median family income was $48,207. Males had a median income of $40,345 versus $22,396 for females. The per capita income for the city was $15,589. About 5.0% of families and 7.2% of the population were below the poverty line, including 9.3% of those under age 18 and 7.6% of those age 65 or over.

Education
Public education in the city of Iraan is provided by the Iraan-Sheffield Independent School District.

References

External links
 Iraan-Sheffield Chamber of Commerce
 Handbook of Texas online

Cities in Texas
Cities in Pecos County, Texas
1920s establishments in Texas
Populated places established in the 1920s